Love at First Sight is an album by jazz saxophonist Sonny Rollins, released on the Milestone label in 1980, featuring performances by Rollins with George Duke, Stanley Clarke, Al Foster and Bill Summers.

Reception

The Allmusic review by Scott Yanow states: "Decent music but nothing that memorable occurs."

Track listing
All compositions by Sonny Rollins except as indicated
 "Little Lu" – 6:38  
 "The Dream That We Fell Out of" (Stanley Clarke) – 4:14  
 "Strode Rode" – 7:33  
 "The Very Thought of You" (Ray Noble) – 5:38  
 "Caress" (George Duke) – 7:25  
 "Double Feature" (Clarke, Rollins) – 4:51  
Recorded at Fantasy Studios, Berkeley, CA, on May 9–12, 1980

Personnel
Sonny Rollins - tenor saxophone, lyricon
George Duke - piano, electric piano
Stanley Clarke - electric bass
Al Foster - drums (tracks 1–3 & 5)
Bill Summers - congas, percussion (tracks 1 & 5)

See also
 Love at first sight

References

1980 albums
Milestone Records albums
Sonny Rollins albums
Albums produced by Orrin Keepnews